Antoine-François-Marie Deschamps Saint Amand, known as Antony Deschamps and Antoni Deschamps (12 March 180028 October 1869) was a French poet.

Antony Deschamps was born in Paris, and was the brother of one of the first representatives of the Romantic movement, Émile Deschamps, on whom he had some literary influence.  He himself wrote some poems, especially political satires, published in 1831.  His partial verse translation of the Divine Comedy of Dante, published in 1829, earned him some fame.

His poems Dernières Paroles and Résignation were republished with his brother’s in 1841. He also worked with his friend Hector Berlioz, and died the same year as him.

Works
La Divine Comédie de Dante Alighieri, translated into French verse
Trois satires politiques, preceded by a prologue, 1831
Dernières paroles, poems, 1835
Résignation, poems, 1839
Poésies de Émile et Antoni Deschamps, 1841
La Jeune Italie, 1844

References

External links
 

1800 births
1869 deaths
Writers from Paris
19th-century French poets
French male poets
19th-century French male writers